Tuba or Tuğba (also transliterated as Toba, Tooba, or Touba; , , lit. "blessedness") is a female given name of Arabic origin common in Turkey.  It derives from the ṭūbā tree that Muslims believe grows in heaven. Other meanings ascribed are "blessedness", "good news", "pure beauty","delightful" and "life". The name is a modern Arabic borrowing into Turkish and has become a common female name in Turkey since the 1970s.  It is often spelt Tuğba there, and that spelling has the same pronunciation as Tuba.

People
Toba or Tooba
Toba Khedoori (born 1964), Australian artist
Tooba Siddiqui (born 1984), Pakistani model

Tuba
Hilal Tuba Tosun Ayer (born 1970), Turkish female referee
Tuba Büyüküstün (born 1982), Turkish television and film actress
Tuba Dokur (born 1992), Turkish ice hockey player
Tuba Ünsal (born 1981), Turkish actress and model
Tuba Yenen (born 1991), Turkish karateka

Tuğba
Ahu Tuğba (real name Tuğba Çetin, born 1963), Turkish actress
Tuğba Danışmaz (born 1999), Turkish long jump and triple jump athlete
Tuğba Daşdemir (born 1987), Turkish skier
Tuğba Ekinci (born 1974), Turkish pop singer
Tuğba Karademir (born 1985), Turkish figure skater
Tuğba Karakaya (born 1991), Turkish middle distance runner
Tuğba Karataş (born 1992), Turkish footballer
Tuğba Önal (born 1974), Turkish singer
Tuğba Özay (born 1978), Turkish model-turned-singer and a famous star in Turkey
Tuğba Özerk, Turkish singer
Tuğba Palazoğlu (born 1980), Turkish professional basketball player
Tuğba Şenoğlu (born 1998), Turkish volleyball player
Tuğba Taşçı (born 1984), Turkish professional basketball player
Tuğba Yurt (born 1987), a Turkish singer

Places
Masjid-e-Tooba, in Karachi, Pakistan
Tuba Shahi Mosque, in Baku, Azerbaijan
Touba, city in Senegal

References

See also
Chief Tuba (also Tuvi or Toova) (1810–1887), Hopi leader in the late 19th century
Tuba, brass musical instrument
Tuba (disambiguation)

Turkish feminine given names